Russian submarine Kazan may refer to one of the following submarines of the Russian Navy:

 
 

Russian Navy ship names

ru:Казань (подводная лодка)